The 2003 African U-17 Championship was a football competition organized by the Confederation of African Football (CAF). The tournament took place in Swaziland. The top three teams qualified for the 2003 FIFA U-17 World Championship.

Qualification

Qualified teams

 

 (host nation)

Squads

Group stage

Group A

{| cellpadding="0" cellspacing="0" width="100%"
|-
|width="60%"|

Group B
{| cellpadding="0" cellspacing="0" width="100%"
|-
|width="60%"|

Knock-out stage

Semi-finals

For winning their semi-finals, Cameroon and Sierra Leone qualified for the 2003 FIFA U-17 World Championship with Egypt and Nigeria meeting in the third place match for the third and final place in the 2003 FIFA U-17 World Championship.

Third place match

For winning the third place match, Nigeria qualified for the 2003 FIFA U-17 World Championship with Egypt missing out.

Final

References

External links
 CAF Official Website
 RSSSF.com: African U-17 Championship 2003

Africa U-17 Cup of Nations
under
2003 in youth association football